The Call of the Wretched Sea is the debut album by the German funeral doom band Ahab. It was released in October 2006.

History 
The Call of the Wretched Sea is Ahab's first studio album. It was the band's first recording since their first two demos. To record the album, they recruited Corny Althammer as session drummer. Production, engineering, mastering and mixing tasks were carried out by Stephan Adolph.

It was released on 10 October 2006 through Napalm Records. Double-LP versions of this album were released through Deviant Records; there were 100 copies in green vinyl, 100 copies in red vinyl, and 300 copies in black vinyl.

Music 
The album has been treated as an example of what funeral doom metal represents. It features slow synthesizer melodies, downtuned guitars, echoing percussion, and deep and guttural vocals. Chants and choral vocal parts are also arranged at various points during the album. The track "Old Thunder" features an orchestrated central portion as well as clean-droned baritones substituting the guttural vocals in some sections. "The Sermon" has a central passage of near-silent melodic ripples that temporarily interrupt the album's guitar passages.

The Call of the Wretched Sea is a concept album which attempts to reinterpret Herman Melville's 1851 novel Moby-Dick. Some of its lyrics have been adapted directly from Melville's writings. The album tries to represent the feelings of foreboding as told through the story of the book's main character, the despotic Captain Ahab.

Critical reception 

The album was given a 4 of 5 by AllMusic and an 8 of 10 by blabbermouth.net. It has been considered a fine example of the style, but not appealing enough to people who don't appreciate doom metal, specifically funeral doom. Corny Althammer's drumming was specially praised.

Track listing 
Music by Ahab. Lyrics written by Herman Melville except "The Pacific" by Daniel Droste and Melville; "Old Thunder" by Christian Hector; and "The Hunt" by Christian Hoffarth.

Personnel 
Ahab
 Daniel Droste – vocals, guitar
 Christian Hector – guitar, layout design
 Stephan Adolph – bass, guitar, vocals, production, engineering, mastering, mixing
 Cornelius Althammer – drums
Other
 Caroline Traitler – photography

References 

2006 debut albums
Ahab (band) albums
Concept albums
Music based on novels
Napalm Records albums
Works based on Moby-Dick